Pleasant View may refer to:

United States

Cities and communities 
 Pleasant View, Colorado
 Pleasant View, Indiana
 Pleasant View, Kentucky
 Pleasant View, Maryland, a settlement near Point of Rocks, Maryland
 Pleasant View, Tennessee
 Pleasant View, Utah
 Pleasant View, Washington
 Pleasant View Township (disambiguation)

Buildings 
 Samuel F. Glass House, a house in Franklin, Tennessee, also known as Pleasant View
 Pleasant View (Forest, Virginia), a historic house
 Pleasant View (UTA station), a transit station in Pleasant View, Utah
 Pleasant View (Midlothian, Virginia), listed on the National Register of Historic Places in Chesterfield County, Virginia
 Pleasant View School for the Arts
 Pleasant View Home, a residential facility and former historic home in Concord, New Hampshire

Canada 
 Pleasant View, Toronto, Ontario, an officially designated neighbourhood

South Africa 
 Pleasent View, Gauteng, a small village close to Vanderbijlpark

See also
 Pleasantview (disambiguation)